The 1963 Marshall Thundering Herd football team was an American football team that represented Marshall University in the Mid-American Conference (MAC) during the 1963 NCAA University Division football season. In its fifth season under head coach Charlie Snyder, the team compiled a 5–4–1 record (3–2–1 against conference opponents), finished in fourth place out of seven teams in the MAC, scored 139 points, and gave up 139 points. Zeke Myers and Everett Vance were the team captains. The team played its home games at Fairfield Stadium in Huntington, West Virginia.

Schedule

References

Marshall
Marshall Thundering Herd football seasons
Marshall Thundering Herd football